Truth and Janey was an American rock band from Iowa. It took its name from Jeff Beck's Truth album and member Billy Janey's last name. The group was influenced by such power trios as Cream and The Jimi Hendrix Experience. The band toured with Leslie West and performed a music festival with Blue Öyster Cult. They were inducted into the Iowa Rock 'n Roll Hall of Fame in 2005.

History

Formation
The group formed in 1969 originally with drummer John Fillingsworth. In roughly one year he was replaced by Denis Bunce. In 1972 they released their debut, a 7-inch 45 rpm, "Midnight Horseman" along with a cover of The Rolling Stones song, "Under My Thumb." The following year they released "Straight Eight Pontiac" and "Around and Around" on their own Driving Wheel label. By 1976 they had recorded No Rest for the Wicked, which sold only 1,000 copies upon its original release.

Disbandment
During the later half of the 1970s they disbanded several times. Bassist Steve Bock eventually joined a group called Nowhere Fast, BillyLee would go on to release several solo albums, and Bunce left the music business completely.

Discography
 1976; re-issued 1997 - No Rest for the Wicked
 1977 - Just a Little Bit of Magic
 1988 - Live (double LP)
 2001 - Erupts!

References

American blues rock musical groups
American hard rock musical groups
American psychedelic rock music groups
Heavy metal musical groups from Iowa